Andipattakkadu is a village and Gram panchayat in the Ariyalur taluk of Ariyalur district, Tamil Nadu, India. The Villages Andipattakkadu, Vallakulam are Puthoor are includes in the Andpattakkadu Gram Panchayat

Demographics 

 census, Andipattakkadu had a total population of 3083 with 1565 males and 1518 females.

References 

Villages in Ariyalur district